Jovan Čokor (Serbian Cyrillic: Јован Чокор; 1885–1946) was a Serbian epidemiologist, infectologist, and physician famous for contributing significantly to the works of Robert Koch. Aftering being informed of an error in his works, Koch wrote "[Čokor] saved humanity from a huge epidemic."

1885 births
1946 deaths
Serbian physicians